Japana-rhythm is Bennie K's fourth album.

Track listing
 Haru: Opening (春: Opening)
 Utopia (ユートピア)
 Happy Drive: Taste Your Stuff
 Unity
 Natsu: Interlude　(夏: Interlude)　
 Dreamland
 Osaga
 Puppy Love Pt. 2
 Aki: Interlude (秋: Interlude)
 Tabibito (旅人)
 Sky
 Moonchild
 Fuyu: Interlude (冬: Interlude)
 A Love Story feat. Seamo
 The Christmas (ザ★クリスマス)
 4 Seasons

Charts 
Oricon Sales Chart (Japan)

2005 albums
Bennie K albums